On 24 June 2021 the first major interaction between leaders of Jammu and Kashmir and the Union Government of India post revocation of the former states special status and its reorganisation took place.

Attendees 
Narendra Modi, the Prime Minister of India, chaired the meeting which was held in New Delhi. The leaders from Jammu and Kashmir included four former chief ministers of the state, Farooq Abdullah, Omar Abdullah, Ghulam Nabi Azad and Mehbooba Mufti; four former deputy chief ministers, Kavinder Gupta, Nirmal Kumar Singh, Tara Chand, Muzaffar Hussain Baig, and other mainstream politicians from the region such as Jitendra Singh, Sajjad Lone, Bhim Singh, Ghulam Ahmad Mir, Altaf Bukhari and Mohammed Yousuf Tarigami. The politicians represented eight mainstream political parties with presence in Jammu and Kashmir— Indian National Congress, National Conference, Peoples Democratic Party, Apni Party, Bharatiya Janta Party, Communist Party of India (Marxist), National Panthers Party and People's Conference. Also present were Amit Shah, the Union Minister of Home Affairs; Ajit Doval, the National Security Advisor of India; and Manoj Sinha, the lieutenant governor of Jammu and Kashmir.

Pre-meeting 
Various reasons had been cited by the media for holding the meeting, from back-channel talks to changing geo-politics, to speculation on the topics which would be discussed ranging from further bifurcation, administrative issues to the need to chalk out an outline for the next few months. Officially there was no pre-decided agenda for the meeting.

Proceedings 
Topics discussed included strengthening the democratic processes of the region, release of political prisoners, delimitation, assembly elections and restoration of statehood. Everyone got a chance to speak. There was no "grand announcements" following the meeting. Article 370 did not take up too much time of the meeting, with general agreement that the decision of the Supreme Court would be waited for. Commentators noted that all the attendees said that the meeting was in a "cordial" and "friendly atmosphere".

Commentary 
Following the meeting Lt Gen Syed Ata Hasnain (Retd) commented,
Radha Kumar commented that,
There was also general criticism against the meeting.

See also 

 Meeting at Hendaye
 Ma–Xi meeting

References

Further reading 

2021 in Indian politics